Karen Kamensek (born January 2, 1970 in Chicago) is an American orchestral and opera conductor.

Biography
Her parents came from Kamnica pri Mariboru, Slovenia. Kamensek received degrees in orchestral conducting and piano performance from Indiana University's Jacobs School of Music.

Kamensek has served as the 1st Kapellmeister of the Volksoper Wien from 2000 to 2002.  She was Generalmusikdirektorin (General Music Director) of the Theater Freiburg from 2003 to 2006, the first female conductor in the Freiburg past.  She has served as Interim Music Director at the Slovenian National Theatre in Maribor from 2007 to 2008, and Associate Music Director at the Staatsoper Hamburg from 2008 to 2011.  In 2011, she was named Generalmusikdirektorin and principal conductor of the Staatsoper Hannover, the first female conductor to hold the Hannover posts.  She relinquished the GMD title in 2015 and remained as principal conductor through 2016.

Kamensek made her English National Opera (ENO) conducting debut in March 2016 with Philip Glass's  Akhnaten.  Kamensek has frequently collaborated with Glass and conducted the 2005 Orange Mountain Music recording of the composer's Les Enfants Terribles.  In 2017, Kamensek gave her debut concert at The Proms, with Britten Sinfonia, conducting the first full live performance of Philip Glass's and Ravi Shankar's Passages, with Shankar's daughter Anoushka Shankar as soloist.  She returned to ENO for their 2018 revival of Glass' Satyagraha.

In November 2019, Kamensek made her Metropolitan Opera conducting debut with Akhnaten.  On 23 November 2019, Kamensek conducted the Metropolitan Opera Live in HD performance and cinema transmission of Akhnaten, the second female conductor ever to be featured in the Metropolitan Opera Live in HD series. The recording of Akhnaten subsequently won a 2022 Grammy Award for Best Opera Recording.

References

External links

Women conductors (music)
Music directors (opera)
Contemporary classical music performers
Jacobs School of Music alumni
1970 births
Living people
21st-century American conductors (music)
21st-century American women musicians
Musicians from Chicago
20th-century American conductors (music)
20th-century American women musicians
Classical musicians from Illinois